San Augustine Independent School District is a public school district based in San Augustine, Texas (USA).

The district serves northern and eastern San Augustine County and extends into a small portion of Shelby County.

In 2009, the school district was rated "academically acceptable" by the Texas Education Agency.

Schools
San Augustine High (Grades 9-12)
San Augustine Intermediate (Grades 5-8)
San Augustine Elementary (Grades PK-4)
Accelerated Learning Center (Alternative Campus; Grades 9-12)

References

External links
San Augustine ISD

School districts in San Augustine County, Texas
School districts in Shelby County, Texas